Between 1830 and 1850, Chilean silver mining grew at an unprecedented pace which transformed mining into one of the country's principal sources of wealth. The rush caused rapid demographic, infrastructural, and economic expansion in the semi-arid Norte Chico mountains where the silver deposits lay. A number of Chileans made large fortunes in the rush and made investments in other areas of the economy of Chile. By the 1850s, the rush was in decline and lucrative silver mining definitively ended in the 1870s. At the same time, mining activity in Chile reoriented to saltpetre operations.

Exports of Chilean silver alongside copper and wheat were instrumental to allow Chile to cure the default of its independence debt in London.

Background
Placer deposits of gold were exploited by the Spanish in the 16th century following their arrival in the same century. However, only after the independence in the 19th century did mining once again get prominence among economic activities in Chile. Following the discovery of silver at Agua Amarga (1811) and Arqueros (1825), the Norte Chico mountains north of La Serena were intensely prospected.

Growth cycle

On May 16, 1832, prospector Juan Godoy found a silver outcrop (reventón) 50 km south of Copiapó in Chañarcillo. There are various tales and local sayings explaining the discovery by Godoy; one states that he found it while hunting for guanacos, while another saying holds that the outcrop was revealed to Godoy by his mother Flora Normilla on her deathbed. A third story claims that Godoy was guided to the riches of Chañarcillo by an alicanto, an animal pertaining to Chilean mythology. Godoy successfully claimed the discovered outcrop inscribing a third of the rights for his brother José Godoy and a third for local businessman Miguel Gallo. Godoy and his associates inscribed the claim as La Descubridora (lit. The Discovery). When the three men departed for the site on May 17, they were followed on the sly by local miners. On top of a hill next to Godoy's discovery, these men discovered the silver outcrop that was later known as El Manto de Los Peralta. On May 26, Gallo bought all the rights from the Godoy brothers for a small fortune which however came to dwindle in relation to the future earnings from mining. 

The finding attracted thousands of people to the place and generated significant wealth. Besides Chileans, people from Argentina, Bolivia, and Peru arrived to work in Chañarcillo. During the heyday of Chañarcillo, it produced more than 332 tons of silver ore until the deposits began to be exhausted in 1874. A settlement of 600 people mushroomed in Chañarcillo leading to the establishment of a surveillance system to avoid disorders and theft of ore. Alcohol, knives, and women were banned from Chañarcillo. The settlement evolved over time to a town which was named Pueblo de Juan Godoy in 1846. Pueblo Juan Godoy came to have a plaza, school, market, hospital, theater, a railroad station, a church, and graveyard. 

Following the discovery of Chañarcillo, many other ores were found near Copiapó well into the 1840s, as attested by numerous claims (denuncios) registered at the court of Copiapó. In 1848, another major ore deposit was discovered at Tres Puntas, sparking yet another rush. Copiapó experienced a large demographic shift and urban growth during the rush. It became the centre for trade and services of a large mining district. In 1851, Copiapó was connected by railroad to Caldera, its principal port of export. This was the first railroad to be established in Chile and the third one in South America. The increased importance of the area around Copiapó in national affairs led to the splintering of the northern Coquimbo Province to form the Atacama Province on October 31, 1843. In 1857, a school of mines was established in Copiapó.

The mining zone slowly grew northwards into the diffuse border with Bolivia. Agriculture in Norte Chico and Central Chile also expanded as a consequence of the rush as it created a new market for its product.

The mines of Chañarcillo were:

La Descubridora
Manto de Valdés
Bolaco
Colorada
Las Guías
El Reventón Colorado
Mantos de Bolados
Mina Yungay
Mantos de Ossa
Mantos de Peralta
Constancia
Candelaria
Delirio
Merceditas
San Francisco
Dolores 1
Dolores 2

In the 19th century, Claudio Gay and Benjamín Vicuña Mackenna were among the first to raise the question of the deforestation of Norte Chico caused by the firewood demands of the mining activity. Despite the reality of the degradation caused by mining, and contrary to popular belief, the Norte Chico forests were not pristine before the onset of mining in the 18th century.

Aftermath
By 1855, Copiapó was already in decline. At the end of the silver rush, rich miners had diversified their assets into banking, agriculture, trade and commerce all over Chile. An example of this is silver mining magnate Matías Cousiño who initiated coal mining operations in Lota in 1852 rapidly transforming the town, from being a sparsely populated frontier zone in the mid-19th century, into a large industrial hub.

In 1870, 1570 miners worked in the Chañarcillo mines; however, the mines were exhausted by 1874, and mining largely ended in 1888 after the mines were accidentally flooded. Despite this, Chañarcillo was the most productive mining district in 19th century Chile.

A last major discovery of silver occurred 1870 in Caracoles in Bolivian territory adjacent to Chile. Apart from being discovered by Chileans, the ore was also extracted with Chilean capital and miners.

See also
Chilean wheat cycle
Guano Era
Mate coquimbano
Tierra del Fuego gold rush
War of the Pacific

Notes

References

Bibliography

Commodity booms
Silver rush
Silver mining in Chile
History of Atacama Region
History of Coquimbo Region